J69 may refer to:
 , a Bangor-class minesweeper of the Royal Canadian Navy
 , a Halcyon-class minesweeper of the Royal Navy
 LNER Class J69, a British steam locomotive class
 Parabiaugmented truncated dodecahedron
 Teledyne CAE J69, a turbojet engine